The Third Party is a 2016 Filipino romantic comedy drama film starring Angel Locsin, Sam Milby and Zanjoe Marudo. It is directed by Jason Paul Laxamana from a screenplay written by Charlene Sawit-Esguerra and Patrick John Valencia.

The film was produced by ABS-CBN Film Productions and was theatrically released in Philippine cinemas on October 12, 2016, by Star Cinema.

The film marks Angel Locsin's second movie this year after Everything About Her, and serves a reunion for her and Zanjoe Marudo who both starred in the 2012 film One More Try; both films were also released by Star Cinema.

Premise
The story revolves between exes Andi, an events manager who aspires to be a fashion designer (portrayed by Angel) and Max, a cosmetic surgeon (portrayed by Sam) who both find ways to keep their relation intact after a breakup. But later on, Max finds new love with a gay Pediatrician, Christian (portrayed by Zanjoe). Andi gets pregnant by Íñigo (portrayed by Paolo Paraiso) who abandons her, and the trio (Andi, Max, and Christian) forms a family. The film also tackles friendship and how a person gets to know more about himself.

Cast

Main cast

Angel Locsin as Andi Medina
Sam Milby as Max Labrador
Zanjoe Marudo as Christian Pilar

Supporting Cast
Maris Racal as Joan
Al Tantay as Mr. Labrador
Alma Moreno as Juliet
Cherry Pie Picache as Carina Medina
Beauty Gonzalez as  Erica 
Matet de Leon as Lila
Kitkat as Patient
Carla Martinez as Mrs. Labrador
Katrina Legaspi as Badet
Chun Sa Jung as Laurie
Paolo Paraiso as Iñigo
Alora Sasam as Charlene
Odette Khan as Tessie

Release 
The Third Party was theatrically released in the Philippines on October 12, 2016, by Star Cinema.

Music
Baby, I Love Your Way by Morissette Amon and Harana (originally by Peter Frampton) was released as the official soundtrack for the movie.

Reception

Box office 
The film grossed ₱10 million on its first day. The film has been successful nationwide and worldwide, despite its genre,  giving a boost to the LGBT community.
The Third Party reached the 100 Million mark in its 3rd week of showing, joining other successful films that reached 100 Million.

As of April 2019, the movie is available in the United States and elsewhere on Netflix.

Awards

See also 
 My Neighbor's Wife
 No Other Woman
 The Mistress
 A Secret Affair
 The Bride and the Lover
 Trophy Wife
 Love Me Tomorrow
 One More Try (film)
 The Mistress

References

External links 
 
 

Philippine romantic drama films
Philippine LGBT-related films
2016 films
Star Cinema films
2016 romantic drama films
2010s Tagalog-language films
Gay-related films
2016 LGBT-related films
LGBT-related romantic drama films